Simeon is an unincorporated community in Cherry County, Nebraska, United States.

History
A post office was established at Simeon in 1884, and remained in operation until it was discontinued in 1953. Simeon was named for Simeon Mortgareidge, a rancher.

References

Populated places in Cherry County, Nebraska
Unincorporated communities in Nebraska